Miguel Cruz Paz (1914 – 9 March 2000) was a Salvadoran footballer.

Club career
Nicknamed el Americano (the American), Cruz played club football in El Salvador, before going to Chile to play professionally alongside compatriot Armando Chacón at Universidad Católica.

International career
On March 24, 1935 he made his international debut  in El Salvador's first group stage match at the 1935 Central American Games against Cuba, where he also got his first and second goals, scoring the first in a 4–1 victory
Cruz scored 16 goals for the El Salvador national football team from 1935 to 1943. He represented his country at the 1935 Central American Games.

Honours
International
Central American and Caribbean Games Bronze Medal (1): 1935

References

External links
 Se fue Americano Cruz - El Diario de Hoy 
  - La Prensa Grafica  
  - El Diario de Hoy 

1917 births
2000 deaths
Association football forwards
Salvadoran footballers
El Salvador international footballers
Salvadoran expatriate footballers
Club Deportivo Universidad Católica footballers
Expatriate footballers in Chile
Salvadoran expatriate sportspeople in Chile
Salvadoran football managers
Central American and Caribbean Games bronze medalists for El Salvador
Competitors at the 1935 Central American and Caribbean Games
Central American and Caribbean Games medalists in football